Ruth Elizabeth Borson, who writes under the name Roo Borson (born January 20, 1952 in Berkeley, California) is a Canadian poet who lives in Toronto.  After undergraduate studies at UC Santa Barbara and Goddard College, she received an MFA from the University of British Columbia.

She has received many awards for her work, including the Governor General's Literary Award, 2004, and the Griffin Poetry Prize, 2005 for Short Journey Upriver Toward Oishida. She currently lives in Toronto with poet Kim Maltman, and with Kim Maltman and Andy Patton is a member of the collaborative performance poetry ensemble Pain Not Bread.

Works 
Landfall (1977), 
Rain (1980), 
In the Smoky Light of the Fields (1980), 
A Sad Device (1981), 
The Whole Night, Coming Home (1984),  (nominated for a Governor General's Award)
The Transparence of November / Snow (1985),  (with Kim Maltman)
Intent, or, The Weight of the World (1989), 
Night Walk (1994),  (nominated for a Governor General's Award)
Water Memory (1996), 
Introduction to the Introduction to Wang Wei (2000),  (by Pain Not Bread)
Short Journey Upriver Toward Oishida (2004),  (winner of the 2004 Governor General's Award, the 2005 Canadian Griffin Poetry Prize and the 2005 Pat Lowther Award)
Personal History (2008) 
Rain; road; an open boat (2012), 
Box Kite: Prose Poems by Baziju (2016),  (with Kim Maltman)
Cardinal in the Eastern White Cedar (2017),

References

External links 
 Griffin Poetry Prize biography
 Griffin Poetry Prize reading, including video clip
 "Summer Grass" from Short Journey Upriver Toward Oishida, online at CBC Words at Large
Roo Borson's entry in The Canadian Encyclopedia
 Canadian Poetry Online: Roo Borson – Biography and 6 poems (Camouflage, Ten Thousand, Loyalties, Summer's Drug, Save Us From, Leaving the Island)
 Archives of Roo Borson (Roo Borson and Kim Maltman fonds, (R12759) are held at Library and Archives Canada

1952 births
Living people
Canadian women poets
Governor General's Award-winning poets
Writers from Berkeley, California
University of British Columbia alumni
Writers from Toronto
20th-century Canadian poets
21st-century Canadian poets
20th-century Canadian women writers
21st-century Canadian women writers
Pseudonymous women writers
20th-century pseudonymous writers
21st-century pseudonymous writers